Widawski may refer to:

Józefów Widawski, a village in Poland
Chaim Widawski, activist and Holocaust victim